This list contains all of the series that have run in the monthly Shōnen manga magazine, . Shōnen Book was known for featuring many popular manga by many popular manga artists. Some found their way into the US in the 1970s, although the magazine remains little known there.

Manga titles with a shade of light green appeared in the last issue.

Manga series

1950s

1958–1959
Shōnen Book had very few series at its commencement because it started as an offshoot of the already successful Omoshiro Book. Shōnen Book is starting to gain more series, as it eases its way into a separate publication.

1960s

1960–1964
Shōnen Book finally launched into a new magazine. In addition to the launch, it now has several more series. Like many other manga magazines, it also adds series along the way. Shōnen Book grows with another set of series. Other manga pass and go. The past manga series end, a larger amount appears in the Shōnen Book magazine. The "God of Manga"; Osamu Tezuka gets hired to write and draw a manga for the Shōnen Book anthology, by the name of Shinsengumi.

1965–1969
Shōnen Book announces more series. A video game of Obake no Q-tarō was released in the States as Chubby Cherub. Shōnen Book closed, and was replaced with the offshoot: Bessatsu Shōnen Jump.

Light novel and monogatari series
Shōnen Book, in addition to the manga titles, featured many Light novels and Monogatari (Picture stories).

1950s

1959

1960s

1960–1963

1964–1968

References and footnotes

Shueisha magazines
Shōnen Book
Shōnen manga
Shonen Book